Derek Peter "Del" Palmer is an English singer, songwriter, bass guitarist and sound engineer, best known for his work with Kate Bush, with whom he also had a long-term relationship between the late 1970s and early 1990s. He released his first solo studio album titled Leap of Faith in 2007,  followed by Gift in 2010. His third solo album, Point of Safe Return, was released on 6 March 2015.

Biography
Born in Greenwich, southeast London, he began playing bass in 1967, joining friend Brian Bath's band Cobwebs and Strange. In 1969, Palmer and Bath formed Tame with Victor King on drums. The band lasted until 1970. From 1972, Palmer and Bath were in Company with Barry Sherlock (guitar) and Lionel Azulay (drums). They signed to Cube Records in 1973, but Azulay was injured in a road accident. Charlie Morgan joined on drums in 1974 and the band changed its name to Conkers. A series of singles followed on Cube.

In 1977, the KT Bush Band began with Bush, Palmer, Bath and Vic King, playing the pub circuit. Their live set included material that would later appear on Bush's first album. Beginning with her second album, 1978 release, Lionheart, Palmer became one of Bush's main studio bassists (along with John Giblin). He also toured with her in 1979.

He is credited as an engineer on Kate Bush's Hounds of Love (1985), The Sensual World (1989), The Red Shoes (1993)  and Aerial (2005). Furthermore, Del Palmer is prevalent in some of Kate Bush's music videos; in 1982, he played the get-a-way car driver in the video to "There Goes a Tenner", and in 1986, appeared in the  critically acclaimed extended video to "Experiment IV", in which he plays a patient in a secret military base  where the 'experiment' of the song's title is performed on him with horrific  consequences. The clip, described as a 'film in miniature' also features Hugh Laurie, Peter Vaughan, Dawn French and Paddy Bush; it was banned from broadcast on the BBC programme, Top of the Pops, due to the graphic nature of the video. The music video, directed by Bush herself, went on to be nominated for the Best Concept Music Video at the 1988 Grammy Awards. Also in 1986, he appeared in the video to "The Big Sky" as a guitar playing Army Major, which, in 1987, was nominated for Best Female Video at the MTV Video Music Awards.  Del Palmer also played Houdini, the man about to be kissed by Bush on the front cover to her 1982 album, The Dreaming. He's credited with engineering on three further albums involving Bush: Midge Ure's Answers to Nothing (where Palmer engineered her vocal guest recordings), Roy Harper's Once and Alan Stivell's Again. He played bass guitar on Lionheart, Never for Ever, The Dreaming, Hounds of Love, The Sensual World and Aerial (on 5 tracks), and on one track on 50 Words for Snow.

Recent activity
Palmer plays bass on Billy Sherwood's Back Against the Wall and Return to the Dark Side of the Moon, both Pink Floyd tribute albums. He released his first solo album titled Leap of Faith in 2007 with a follow up five-track EP titled Outtees & Alternatives in 2008. He appeared in the BBC documentary Queens of British Pop discussing Kate Bush, and again in the BBC Four documentary The Kate Bush Story – Running Up That Hill. He released his second album entitled Gift in 2010. His third album, Point of Safe Return, released in March 2015.

In 2018, he played a series of concerts in England and Ireland, with members of Kate Bush tribute band Cloudbusting, to celebrate 40 years since the release of her first album.

Discography
 Leap of Faith (2007)
 Gift (2010)
 Point of Safe Return (2015)

References

Living people
English audio engineers
English bass guitarists
English male guitarists
Male bass guitarists
English male singers
20th-century English singers
20th-century bass guitarists
21st-century English singers
21st-century British guitarists
People from Greenwich
Singers from London
20th-century British male singers
21st-century British male singers
Year of birth missing (living people)